Kalnujai is a village in Raseiniai District Municipality in Lithuania with a population of 402 inhabitants (2011).

History
During the summer of 1941, an Einsatzgruppen of German and Lithuanian nationalists murdered the Jews of the nearby town of Raseiniai and the surroundings on a site in Kalnujai. Hundred of Jews died in the mass executions. A memorial is built on the site of the massacre.

References

External links 

Villages in Kaunas County
Holocaust locations in Lithuania